This article lists the characters featured in the Brazilian Globo telenovela Lado a Lado.

Main characters

Supporting characters

Child characters

Special appearances

References

See also 
Lado a Lado
Lado a Lado (soundtrack)

Lado a Lado
Lado a Lado